The 2012–13 Czech Women's First League was the 20th season of the Czech Republic's top-tier football league for women. Sparta Praha were the defending champions and successfully defended their title.

Format
The eight teams will play each other twice for a total of 14 matches per team. After that the top four teams will play a championship round for another six matches per team. The bottom placed four teams play the relegation round. Points accumulated after the regular season are halved and added the points from the next round. The champion qualifies for the UEFA Champions League.

Regular season

Standings

Results

Final stage
Points of the regular season were halved and rounded up, goal difference was kept.

Championship group
Played by the teams placed first to fourth of the regular season. Teams play each other twice.

Relegation group
Played by the teams placed fifth to eighth of the regular season. Teams play each other twice.

Relegation play-off
Eighth place Brno played a two-legged play-off against FK Bohemians Prague. Bohemians had won the second league promotion play-off against Olomouc 6–4 on aggregate. FK Bohemians Prague then won the relegation play-off 2–2 (4-3 on penalties) on aggregate and promoted to the first division.

Personnel and kits

Note: Flags indicate national team as has been defined under FIFA eligibility rules. Players may hold more than one non-FIFA nationality.

Top scorers
Regular season

Source: fotbal.cz

References

External links
Season on soccerway.com

2012–13 domestic women's association football leagues
2012–13 in Czech football
Czech Women's First League seasons